Pitas is the capital of the Pitas District in the Kudat Division of Sabah, Malaysia. Its population was estimated to be around 895 in 2010. The local populace is made up predominantly of ethnic Rungus (majority), Orang Sungai and Tombonuo descent, with a small number of Malaysian Chinese and other ethnic minorities. Due to its geographical isolation and the general unsuitability of the land for agriculture, Pitas has one of the highest rates of poverty in Sabah.

Climate
Pitas has a tropical rainforest climate (Af) with heavy to very heavy rainfall year-round.

References

External links 

Pitas District
Towns in Sabah